Archipolypoda is an extinct group of millipedes known from fossils in Europe and North America and containing the earliest known land animals.  The Archipolypoda was erected by Scudder (1882) but redefined in 2005 with the description of several new species from Scotland. Distinguishing characteristics include relatively large eyes with densely packed ocelli (sometimes interpreted as compound eyes), and modified leg pairs on the 8th body ring. Some species had prominent spines while others had a flattened appearance.

Classification
The Archipolypoda as currently recognized consists of four orders, many with monotypic families and genera, as well as five species of uncertain placement (incertae sedis).

Archidesmida Wilson & Anderson, 2004
Archidesmidae Scudder, 1885  
Archidesmus macnicoli Peach, 1882.  Lower Devonian, Scotland 
Zanclodesmidae Wilson, Daeschler & Desbiens, 2005 
Zanclodesmus willetti Wilson, Daeschler & Desbiens, 2005.  Upper Devonian, Quebec, Canada
Orsadesmus rubecollus Wilson, Daeschler & Desbiens, 2005.  Upper Devonian, Pennsylvania, USA
Cowiedesmida Wilson & Anderson, 2004 
Cowiedesmidae Wilson & Anderson, 2004
Cowiedesmus eroticopodus Wilson & Anderson, 2004. Mid Silurian, Scotland.
Euphoberiida Hoffman, 1969
Euphoberiidae Scudder, 1882. Upper Carboniferous of Europe and North America. 
Acantherpestes Meek & Worthen, 1868
Euphoberia Meek & Worthen, 1868 
Myriacantherpestes Burke, 1979
Palaeosomatida Hannibal & Krzeminski, 2005. Carboniferous, UK and Poland 
Palaeosomatidae Hannibal & Krzeminski, 2005
Palaeosoma

Order incertae sedis
Albadesmus almondi Wilson & Anderson, 2004  Mid Silurian Scotland
Anaxeodesmus diambonotus Wilson, 2005 Upper Carboniferous, UK.
Anthracodesmus macconochiei, Peach, 1899 
Palaeodesmus tuberculata (Brade-Birks, 1923) (=Kampecaris tuberculata)   Lower Devonian, Scotland. 
Pneumodesmus newmani Wilson & Anderson, 2004 Mid Silurian, Scotland

See also

 Arthropleuridea- Another group of extinct millipedes
 Euthycarcinoidea, a group of enigmatic arthropods that may be ancestral to myriapods
 Colonization of land, major evolutionary stages leading to terrestrial organisms

References

External links
Archipolypoda- The Virtual Fossil Museum
Orsadesmus rubecollus, Devonian Times
Fossil find 'oldest land animal'- BBC News

Millipede taxonomy
Arthropod superorders
Devonian myriapods
Carboniferous myriapods
Silurian myriapods
Wenlock first appearances
Pennsylvanian extinctions
Fossil taxa described in 1882